, the International Union for Conservation of Nature (IUCN) has evaluated the conservation status of 15 species within Chromista. 
The IUCN has not evaluated any protist species other than those in Chromista. No Chromista subspecies or subpopulations have been evaluated.  No evaluated Chromista species are confirmed to be extinct, but four are tagged as possibly extinct.

 the New Zealand Threat Classification System has evaluated 38 species of macroalgae as Threatened and 23 as Data Deficient.  Some of these species are only of concern nationally.

IUCN evaluations

Critically Endangered (possibly extinct)
Bifurcaria galapagensis - Galapagos stringweed
Desmarestia tropica - tropical acidweed
Dictyota galapagensis
Spatoglossum schmittii

Endangered
Sargassum setifolium - string sargassum

Vulnerable
Eisenia galapagensis - Galapagos kelp

Data Deficient

All are brown algae (Phaeophyceae):
Of the Dictyotaceae,
Dictyopteris diaphana
Dictyota major
Padina concrescens
Spatoglossum ecuadoreanum
Of the Chordariaceae,
Zosterocarpus abyssicola
Of the Sargassaceae,
Sargassum albemarlense
Sargassum galapagense
Sargassum templetonii
Of the Sporochnaceae,
Sporochnus rostratus

NZTCS evaluations

Nationally Critical
 Dione arcuata - One Location

Range Restricted
 Caulerpa racemosa - Secure Overseas
 Caulerpa sertulariodes - Secure Overseas, One Location
 Caulerpa webbiana - Secure Overseas, One Location
 Chlidophyllon kaspar - One Location
 Chordariopsis capensis - Data Poor, Secure Overseas
 Chrysymenia? polydactyla - Data Poor, One Location
 Codium geppiorum - Secure Overseas, One Location
 Curdiea balthazar - One Location
 Dichotomaria marginata - Secure Overseas, One Location
 Durvillaea sp. Antipodes WELT A17080 - One Location
 Durvillaea chathamensis - One Location
 Galaxaura cohaerens - One Location
 Galaxaura filamentosa - One Location
 Galaxaura rugosa - One Location
 Ganonema farinosa - One Location
 Gelidium allanii - Threatened Overseas
 “Gelidium” ceramoides
 Gelidium longipes - One Location
 Gigartina sp. Bounty Is. - One Location
 Gigartina dilatata - 
 Gigartina grandifida - One Location
 Gigartina sp. Three Kings - One Location
 Landsburgia ilicifolia - Data Poor, One Location
 Landsburgia myricifolia - One Location
 Lessonia adamsiae - One Location
 Lessonia brevifolia - 
 Lessonia tholiformis - One Location
 Marginariella parsonsii
 Palmophyllum umbracola
 Perisporochnus regalis - One Location
 Predaea sp. - One Location
 Psilosiphon scoparium - Threatened Overseas
 Pterocladia lindaueri - One Location
 Pyrophyllon cameronii - One Location
 Sargassum johnsonii - One Location
 Sonderopelta coriacea - Secure Overseas, One Location
 Tricleocarpa cylindrica - Secure Overseas, One Location

Data Deficient
 Acrochaete endostraca
 Acrochaetium leptonemioides - One Location
 Acrochaetium neozeelandicum - One Location
 Bangia spp. 
 Caulerpa fastigiata
 Cephalocystis furcellata
 Champiocolax sp. 
 Codium perriniae
 Codium platyclados - Threatened? Overseas
 Cutleria mollis
 Entocladia spp. 
 Epicladia testarum
 Erythrotrichia bangioides - One Location
 Erythrotrichia hunterae - One Location
 Giraudyopsis stellifera - Secure Overseas
 Nemacystus novae-zelandiae
 Ochlochaete hystrix
 Ovillaria catenata
 Porphyra spp. 
 Porphyridium purpuream - Secure Overseas
 Pseudobryopsis planktonica - One Location
 Sebdenia lindaueri - One Location
 Syncoryne reinkei

See also
 List of fungi by conservation status

References

Chromista
Biota by conservation status
Eukaryotes